Fame, Fortune and Fornication is a cover album by ska punk band Reel Big Fish.

Release
In September 2008, they went on a Canadian tour with Less Than Jake, the Flatliners, and the Real Deal. On October 16, 2008, the band announced that they would release their next album in January 2009. Four days later, the band announced that their next album would be titled Fame, Fortune and Fornication and consist of covers. On November 19, 2008, the album's artwork was posted online. From the beginning of January to mid-March 2009, the band went on tour with Streetlight Manifesto, Tip the Van, and One Pin Short. The album was released on January 20, 2009 through Rock Ridge Music. The album's cover features Suburban Legends' guitarist Brian Klemm in hair metal attire, as he appears on the cover of Suburban Legends' 2008 album, Let's Be Friends and Slay the Dragon Together. The vinyl edition of the album was released on March 24, 2009. In July and August 2009, the band went on a US tour with the Beat and the Supervillains. In December 2009 and January 2010, the band went on a West Coast tour, prior to shows in Russia. After this, they embarked on a UK tour, followed by a stint in mainland Europe. They then visited Australia as part of the Soundwave festival in February and March 2010. Following this, the band appeared at the Extreme Thing festival.

Track listing

Personnel
Reel Big Fish
 Aaron Barrett - Lead guitar, lead vocals
 John Christianson - Trumpet
 Derek Gibbs - Bass guitar
 Scott Klopfenstein - Trumpet, vocals
 Dan Regan - Trombone
 Ryland Steen - Drums

Additional musicians
 Tatiana DeMaria of TAT - Female vocals on "Talk Dirty To Me"
 Brian Klemm of Suburban Legends - Gang vocals
 David Irish - Percussion

References

External links

Fame, Fortune and Fornication at YouTube (streamed copy where licensed)

2009 albums
Reel Big Fish albums
Rock Ridge Music albums
Covers albums